Hakob Hakobian, Hakob Hakobyan, or in Western Armenian Hagop Hagopian, may refer to:

 Hagop Hagopian (militant) (1951–1988), Armenian military leader, founder of ASALA
 Hakob Hakobian (painter) (1923–2013), modern Armenian painter
 Hakob Hakobian (poet) (1866–1937), Soviet Armenian poet
 Hakob Melik Hakobian, known as Raffi (1835–1888), Armenian author
 Hakob Hakobyan (actor), Modern Armenian actor; see Abel's Sister
 Hakob Hakobyan (footballer) (born 1997), Armenian footballer
 Hakob Hakobyan (politician) (1963–2021), Armenian politician